Evelyn Acham (born circa 1991) is a climate justice activist from Uganda and national Ugandan coordinator of the Rise Up Movement, which was founded by her friend and fellow organizer Vanessa Nakate.

Acham was born around 1991. She is part of the +Tree Project, where her goal is to plant 9,000,000 trees. On May 26, 2020, Acham was one of the panelist for ActionAid and Women's Agenda's webinar series Women Leading Climate Action series, which was a virtual interactive discussion on how women have been fighting climate change during COVID-19. She also presented alongside Inge Relph - the executive director and co-founder of Global Choices - and Emma Wilkin - the coordinator of Global Choices’ Arctic Angels - for the 2020 Model United Nations (MUN) Impact Global Summit. In 2021, she attended the 2021 United Nations Climate Change Conference and represented Fridays for Future Most Affected People and Areas (MAPA). Fridays for Future MAPA was one of the climate advocacy groups that formed after Climate activists Greta Thunberg's 2018 strike. Acham was also featured in The New York Times' 2021 Climate Hub discussion "Passing the Torch: Intergenerational Climate Dialogues" alongside Jerome Foster II, Aya Chebbi, Mary Robinson.

Acham's other affiliations include Youth for Future Africa and Global Choices' action network "Arctic Angels."

References

External links 

 Official Twitter Account
 Interview with Evelyn Acham for Bocconi University Newspaper

1990s births
Ugandan activists
Climate activists
Ugandan women activists
Living people